Thailand participated in the 1962 Asian Games in Jakarta on 24 August to 4 September 1962. Thailand ended the games at 12 overall medals including 2 gold medals.

Nations at the 1962 Asian Games
1962
Asian Games